Pasce Oves Meas is a sculptural relief designed by the Italian artist Gianlorenzo Bernini and executed by members of his workshop, with some involvement of Bernini himself. The work was commissioned in 1633 but was not installed in its destination of St Peter's, Rome until 1646.

See also
List of works by Gian Lorenzo Bernini

Notes

References

Further reading
 
 
 

1630s sculptures
1640s sculptures
Marble sculptures in Italy
Sculptures by Gian Lorenzo Bernini